is a railway station on the Shinano Railway Line in the city of Tōmi, Nagano, Japan, operated by the third-sector railway operating company Shinano Railway.

Lines
Tanaka Station is served by the 65.1 km Shinano Railway Line and is 31.3 kilometers from the starting point of the line at Karuizawa Station.

Station layout
The station consists of one ground-level side platform and ne ground-level island platform serving three tracks, connected to the station building by a footbridge. The station is staffed.

Platforms

Adjacent stations

History
The station opened on 1 December 1888.

Passenger statistics
In fiscal 2011, the station was used by an average of 2,446 passengers daily.

Surrounding area
Tōmi City Hall

See also
 List of railway stations in Japan

References

External links

 

Railway stations in Nagano Prefecture
Railway stations in Japan opened in 1888
Shinano Railway Line
Tōmi, Nagano